The yellow-bellied seedeater (Sporophila nigricollis) is a species of bird in the family Thraupidae, formerly placed with the American sparrows in the Emberizidae.

Taxonomy and systematics

Hooded seedeater
The hooded seedeater was a proposed bird species described by Austrian ornithologist August von Pelzeln as Spermophila melanops in 1870. The only known individual was heavily moulted and caught in October 1823 from a flock of other seedeater species at the edge of a lake 15 kilometres north of Registro do Araguaia, Brazil. It is now considered to be either a hybrid or an abnormal specimen of the yellow-bellied seedeater. The bird had a black crest and throat, the upperparts were olive and the underparts showed a dingy buff. In contrast, a typical yellow-bellied seedeater has pale yellow underparts and the black colouring extends to the upper breast.

Distribution and habitat
The yellow-bellied seedeater is found in Central and South America from Costa Rica to Bolivia. Its natural habitats are subtropical or tropical high-altitude shrubland, pastureland, and heavily degraded former forest.

Threats
One study in Brazil, estimated that 16,800 yellow-bellied seedeaters are illegally caught and sold as pets annually.

References

yellow-bellied seedeater
Birds of Costa Rica
Birds of Panama
Birds of Brazil
Birds of Colombia
Birds of Venezuela
Birds of Ecuador
Birds of Peru
Birds of Trinidad and Tobago
yellow-bellied seedeater
Taxa named by Louis Jean Pierre Vieillot
Taxonomy articles created by Polbot